Libor "Zábrda" Zábranský (born 25 November 1973) is a Czech former professional ice hockey defenceman and current coach.

Playing career
Zábranský was drafted 209th overall in the 9th round of the 1995 NHL Entry Draft by the St. Louis Blues. He played the majority of his career in the Czech Republic but he did play 40 games over two seasons with St. Louis in the NHL. After retiring from playing due to health problems at the age 30, he became majority owner of the Czech Extraliga team Kometa Brno.

Career statistics

Notes

External links

1973 births
21st-century Czech businesspeople
Czech ice hockey coaches
Czechoslovak ice hockey defencemen
Czech ice hockey defencemen
HC Dynamo Pardubice players
HC Kometa Brno players
HC Tábor players
Living people
Motor České Budějovice players
Ice hockey people from Brno
St. Louis Blues draft picks
St. Louis Blues players
VHK Vsetín players
Worcester IceCats players
Czech expatriate ice hockey players in the United States